Dahranwala (Punjabi, Urdu: ڈاہرانوالہ) is situated in the Satluj Plain, a fertile region known for its rich agricultural production. The city is located in the tehsil Chishtian and Bahawalnagar District of the Punjab province, and is bordered by the cities of Haroonabad to the east, Hasilpur to the west, Chishtian to the south, and Fort Abbas to the north.

Population and Demographics 
The population of Dahranwala is approximately 300,000 people. The city is home to people from a variety of ethnicities, including Punjabi, Urdu and Pashtun.. The majority of the population is Muslim, with a small minority of Christians.

Economy 
Agriculture and industry are major contributors to the economy of Dahranwala. The city is known for its production of crops such as wheat and cotton.

Education 
Dahranwala is home to a number of educational institutes, including government schools and colleges for both boys and girls, as well as private schools. Some of the notable educational institutes in the city are:

Healthcare 
Dahranwala is a small town with limited healthcare options. While there is one Rural Health Unit hospital and several private hospitals, there is no large hospital in the area. In the event of an emergency, patients may need to be transported to the main hospital in the division of Bahawal Victoria Hospital Bahawalpur, which is located a significant distance away from Dahranwala. The nearest DHQ Hospital Bahawalnagar is also 75 km from Dahranwala, making it difficult for residents to access necessary medical care. Unfortunately, the private hospitals in Dahranwala may not have the capacity to properly treat serious patients, meaning that those in need of more advanced care must travel long distances to receive it.

Sports 
Unfortunately, Dahranwala lacks adequate sports facilities for its youth population. The only sports ground in the city is located at the government higher secondary school, but it lacks the necessary facilities to accommodate a variety of sports. Despite this, cricket, football, and volleyball are popular sports played in Dahranwala. While some tournaments, such as floodlight cricket and football tournaments, are held regularly, the lack of proper sports grounds limits the ability of the youth in Dahranwala to engage in healthy sporting activities. It is clear that there is a high demand for sports grounds in Dahranwala, and it would greatly benefit the health and well-being of the youth if such facilities were made available.

Culture 
Dahranwala has a rich cultural heritage, with a variety of traditional festivals and events being celebrated throughout the year. The city is also home to a number of historical and cultural events, including 75 Mod Mela and Urs of Peer Muhammad Ali Shah.

Transportation 

Dahranwala is also an important transportation hub, with road connections to other cities in Pakistan. However, the road network in the city is not in good condition. Poor road conditions can be a challenge for residents and businesses alike, as it can make it difficult to move goods and people efficiently.

Government and Politics 
In 2017, the Punjab government committee recommended that Dahranwala be given tehsil status and forwarded the summary to the Punjab Chief Minister for final approval. However, the recommendation has not yet been implemented and there has been no further action on the matter. It is unclear why the recommendation has been postponed and whether it will be pursued in the future. Some people have speculated that the recommendation was made as a political tactic to gain votes, rather than a genuine effort to improve the administration of the city.

Administration
Dahranwala town consists of 9 union councils which are mostly villages.

List of union councils

Climate
The climate of Dahranwala is hot and humid. The temperature extremes occur during the months of May, June, and July, when the temperature may reach 49–55 °C. In August, the monsoon season starts, with heavy rainfall throughout the area. December and January are the coldest months, when temperatures can drop to –1 °C. The annual average rainfall is 160 mm.

Political Persons From Dahranwala 
Dahranwala has produced several notable political figures, including;
 Abdul Ghafoor Chaudhry, former MNA, Pakistan Peoples Party
Ali Akber Wains, Former District Mayor PMLQ
 Haji Muhammad Akram, former MNA, PMLN
Ch Tahir Bashir Cheema, former MNAPTI
IIhsan ul Haq Bajwa MNA PMLN
Abdullah Wains, Former MPA & Vice President PTI South Punjab
 Sardar Muhammad Afzal Tatlah, former MPA, Pakistan People's Party
 Haji Yaseen Pakistan Muslim League (Z) (Chairman Vital Group)
 Kashif Sana Pakistan Muslim League (Z)
 Mian Muhammad Asim Gulabka
 Muhammad Aslam Gulabka
 Mubashir Saleem Gulabka 

In General Elections 2018 Ch. Ihsan ul Haq Bajwa elected as Member of National Assembly from constituency NA-168 and Ch. Zahid Akram elected as Punjab Assembly from constituency PP-242.

References

Populated places in Bahawalnagar District